USS Saranac may refer to the following ships of the United States Navy:

 , a brig, built in 1814 and decommissioned in 1818.
 , a sloop of war, launched in 1848 and wrecked in 1875.
 , a minelayer, built in 1899, acquired by the Navy in 1917 and decommissioned in 1919.
 , a Type T2-SE-A1 fleet oiler, commissioned in 1943 and decommissioned in 1946.

See also
 USCGC Saranac, United States Coast Guard cutter # 52, launched in 1930 and leased to the Royal Navy as HMS Banff in 1941.

United States Navy ship names